Jeanette Ward is an American politician serving as a member of the Wyoming House of Representatives for the 57th district. Elected in November 2022, she assumed office on January 2, 2023.

Education 
Ward earned a Bachelor of Science in environmental resources management from Pennsylvania State University, a Master of Science in environmental science and health from the University of Nevada, Reno, and a Master of Business Administration from Northern Illinois University.

Career 
From 1997 to 2021, Ward held various positions at DSM, including chemist, account manager, and regulatory affairs manager. Since 2006, Ward has also worked as a coula. In 2021, she became a fiber optic products manager at Covestro. Ward was elected to the board of the Elgin Area School District U46 in 2015 and lost re-election in 2019. She relocated with her family from Elgin, Illinois, to Casper, Wyoming, describing herself as a "political refugee" in a questionnaire. She was elected to the Wyoming House of Representatives in November 2022.

References 

Living people
Wyoming Republicans
Members of the Wyoming House of Representatives
Women state legislators in Wyoming
People from Casper, Wyoming
Pennsylvania State University alumni
University of Nevada, Reno alumni
Northern Illinois University alumni
People from Elgin, Illinois
Year of birth missing (living people)